was a Japanese actor.
Notable film appearances were Seven Samurai and Twenty-Four Eyes. He is also known for his role as Commander Gonpachi Edogawa in the tokusatsu  superhero series Himitsu Sentai Gorenger.

He started his acting career at the Bungakuza theatre company in 1941. In 1943, he made his stage debut with Denen . He gave his film debut with Ginza no Odoriko in 1950. Takahara signed his contract with Nikkatsu studio between 1956 and 1960 and starred in many Nikatsu films, including Sun in the Last Days of the Shogunate directed by Yūzō Kawashima and Pigs and Battleships directed by Shōhei Imamura. He died of heart failure on 26 February 2000.

Filmography

Films

 Ginza no Odoriko (1950) as Rickshaw man
 Listen to the Voices of the Sea (1950) as combat medic
 Kaizoku-sen (1950) as Gyuhi
 Hino hate (1954)
 Taiyō no nai Machi (1954) as young man
 Seven Samurai (1954) as Samurai with Gun
 Okuman chōja (1954) 
 Twenty-Four Eyes (1954) as Chiririn'ya
 Ningen Gyorai Kaiten (1955) as Kawamura
 Sun in the Last Days of the Shogunate (1957) as Kaneji
 Stolen Desire (1958) as Eisuke Katō
 Rusty Knife (1958) as detective Takaishi
 Naked Sun (1958) as Kenzō Sakiyama
 Voice Without a Shadow (1958) as Shigeo Kotani
 My Second Brother (1959) as shop assistant
 Pigs and Battleships (1961) as Doctor Miyaguchi
 Man with a Shotgun (1961) as Okumura
 The Jet That Flew Into the Storm (1961)
 Blood Red Water in the Channel (1961) as Hikawa
 Bad Girl (1963) as Takeda
 Shiroi Kyotō (1966) as Tsukuda
 Men and War  (1971) 
 Karei-naru Ichizoku (1974) as Tsunoda
 Himitsu Sentai Gorenger as Gonpachi Edogawa
 Niji wo Tsukamu Otoko (1996)
 Tokyo Lullaby (1997)
 Natsu Shōjo (produced in 1996, released in 2019)

Television
 Return of Ultraman (1972) (ep.45) as Teacher Hamamura
 Kogarashi Monjirō (1972) (ep.10) as Heikichi
 Oshizamurai Kiichihōgan (1973) (ep.11) as Sakamoto Denemon
 The Water Margin (1974) (ep.15)
 Lone Wolf and Cub (1974) (2nd Season ep.2) as Harada Kazuemon
 Taiyō ni Hoero! (1974) (ep.77), (1977) (ep.266) as Gōda, (1978) (ep.301) as Saitō, (1979) (ep.341) as Toda, (1980) (ep.393) as Kazuhiko Kawakami, (1981) (ep.452)
 Himitsu Sentai Gorenger (1975–77) as Commander Gonpachi Edogawa
 G-Men '75 (1978) (ep.161) as Nishi, (1979) (ep.199) as Kinugasa
 Shin Zatoichi (1979) (3rd season ep.6)
 Ōedo Sōsamō (1979) (ep.386) as Jyoshuya, (1980) (ep.428) as Eichibei
 Shin Edo no Kaze (1980) (ep.15) as Tokuei
 Denshi Sentai Denjiman (1981) (ep.31)
 Sanada Taiheiki (1985) as Nagai
 Shūchakueki Series Ao no Jūjika  (1994)
 Onihei Hankachō (1995) (ep.4) as Isaburō

References

External links
 

Japanese male film actors
20th-century Japanese male actors
1923 births
2000 deaths